Grêmio Esportivo Anápolis, commonly referred to as Grêmio Anápolis, is a Brazilian professional club based in Anápolis, Goiás founded on 3 March 1999. It competes in the Campeonato Goiano, the top flight of the Goiás state football league.

History 
The club was founded on March 15, 1999 as Grêmio Esportivo Inhumense. In 2000 they were promoted to Campeonato Goiano. In 2005 they finished 4th and qualified for the 2005 Campeonato Brasileiro Série C, when they were eliminated in the first stage of the competition.

Stadium 

Grêmio Esportivo Anápolis play their home games at Estádio Jonas Duarte. The stadium has a maximum capacity of 17,800 people.

Honours 
 Campeonato Goiano
 Winners (1): 2021

 Campeonato Goiano Second Division
 Winners (1): 2017

 Campeonato Goiano Third Division
 Winners (1): 2011

References

External links 
 Official Site

Association football clubs established in 1999
Anápolis
1999 establishments in Brazil